Homebush is a rural locality in the Mackay Region, Queensland, Australia. In the  Homebush had a population of 271 people.

History

The name Homebush is taken from the name of a pastoral run name used by John Walker in 1866.

Homebush Post Office opened on 5 December 1883 and closed in 1976.

Homebush Sugar Mill opened in 1883 and closed in 1922.

Homebush State School opened on 24 January 1889. In 2014, Homebush State School celebrated its 125th anniversary.

The opening service for the Homebush Presbyterian Church was held on Sunday 6 October 1912.

In the 2011 census, Homebush had a population of 277 people.

Heritage listings

Homebush has a number of heritage-listed sites, including:
 993 Homebush Road: Homebush Mission Hall

Amenities 
The Mackay Regional Council operates a mobile library service on a fortnightly schedule at Homebush Road near the school.

Education 
Homebush State School is a government primary (Prep-6) school for boys and girls at 1181 Homebush Road. In 2016, there were 59 students. In 2018, the school had an enrolment of 48 students with 3 teachers and 7 non-teaching staff (4 full-time equivalent). It includes a special education program.

There is no secondary school in Homebush. The nearest secondary schools are Mackay State High School in South Mackay to the north-east, Sarina State High School in Sarina to the south-east, and Mirani State High School in Mirani to the north-west.

References

External links 

 

Mackay Region
Towns in Queensland
Localities in Queensland